Rēzeknes apriņķis was a subdivision of the Republic of Latvia and the Latvian SSR. Its administrative centre was Rēzekne.

History 
Established in 1629 as one of the subdivisions of the Inflanty Voivodeship (powiat rzeżycki). In 1772, after the First Partition of Poland it became one of uyezds of Polotsk Governorate (1776—1796), later Belarusian Governorate (1796—1802) and Vitebsk Governorate (1802—1917) of the Russian Empire.

On 31 December 1917 Rezhitsky Uyezd, having a majority Latvian population, was transferred to Governorate of Livonia, becoming a part of the Latvian Soviet autonomy of Iskolat and a part of the Latvian Socialist Soviet Republic on 17 December 1918. After signing of the Latvian–Soviet Peace Treaty, Rēzeknes apriņķis was incorporated into the Republic of Latvia.

In 1949, Rēzeknes apriņķis was transformed to the Rēzeknes District (Rēzeknes rajons) of the Latvian SSR.

Demographics
At the time of the Russian Empire Census of 1897, Rezhitsky Uyezd had a population of 136,445. Of these, 57.9% spoke Latvian, 23.9% Russian, 7.4% Yiddish, 5.4% Belarusian, 4.8% Polish, 0.4% German, 0.1% Lithuanian and 0.1% Romani as their native language.

References